His and Hers is an Australian television series which aired 1971 to 1972 on the 0-10 Network (now Network Ten). It was a daytime panel discussion show featuring a panel of four women and one man. Originally hosted by Ray Taylor, it was later hosted by John Laws. The show was compared with another panel discussion show titled Beauty and the Beast.

References

External links
His and Hers on IMDb

1971 Australian television series debuts
1972 Australian television series endings
Australian television talk shows
Network 10 original programming
Black-and-white Australian television shows
English-language television shows